The GFA Cup, currently known as the BOV GFA Cup for sponsorship reasons, is a knockout football cup competition in Gozo, run by and named after the Gozo Football Association. The competition is played between the clubs of the Gozitan First Division and Second Division. The usual format adopted is that all teams from the Second Division and the teams ranked third to seventh in the previous First Division participate in the preliminary round. The six winning teams make it to the quarter finals together with the remaining top two teams from the First Division.

The current cup holders are Nadur Youngsters who won 3–2 against Għajnsielem in the 2022 final, winning their ninth GFA Cup.

Finals

Results by team 

Teams shown in italics are no longer in existence.

Notes

References

External links 
 Official website of the Gozo Football Association

Recurring sporting events established in 1972
Football cup competitions in Malta
Cup